The Davis Mountains, originally known as Limpia Mountains, are a range of mountains in West Texas, located near Fort Davis, after which they are named. The fort was named for then United States Secretary of War and later Confederate President Jefferson Davis. They are a popular site for camping and hiking and the region includes Fort Davis National Historic Site and Davis Mountains State Park. The historical and architectural value of the fort, alongside the rugged natural environment of the park are a significant destination for tourism in Texas.

Description

Rather than being a single coherent range, the Davis Mountains are an irregular jumble of isolated peaks and ridges separated by flatter areas. The mountains are of volcanic origin composed of strata associated with eruptions of the Trans-Pecos Volcanic Field 35 million years ago. The highest peak in the Davis Mountains is Mount Livermore at  the fifth-highest peak in Texas.

Vegetation
The Davis Mountains are a sky island, an isolated mountain range surrounded by desert. As the elevation increases, average temperatures decline and precipitation increases, permitting an "island" of forest and other mesic habitat at higher elevations.  

The most common vegetation of the Davis Mountains is montane grassland, often mixed with scattered bushes and trees. As is common in most Northern Hemisphere semiarid climates, the vegetation on the southern slopes of the mountains is noticeably sparser than on the northern slopes.  This is due to the greater exposure to the sun on southern slopes, thus warmer temperatures and drier soils.

Mixed in with the grassland, and usually at higher elevations, are four woodland and forest zones. First, at elevations below  and at higher, drier elevations, the dominant tree species is the alligator juniper mixed with oak species and pinyon pine. The gray oak woodlands are found in slightly moister soils than the pinyon woodlands.

These forests are found in stream valleys and other well-watered areas. Aspens are more characteristic of the higher elevations in the Rocky Mountains. The mesic woodlands are remnants of past glacial ages in which the climate of West Texas was more humid and cooler than at present.

Fauna
Over 277 species of birds have been seen at Davis Mountains State Park. Many species found here are characteristic of more northerly mountain climes or alternatively of nearby Mexico, including 10 species of hummingbirds. Large mammals found here include whitetail deer, mule deer, elk, black bear, cougar, pronghorn, peccary, and introduced species such as aoudad and feral hogs. There is only one record of grizzly bears in Texas; it was killed in the Davis Range in 1890. Several private ranches in the Davis Mountains offer hunting opportunities.

Climate
Nearly all of the Davis Mountains fall into the climate classification of BS (semiarid steppe) in the Köppen climate classification system.  However, the highest elevations may transition into a cooler, wetter Cfb climate (subtropical humid with warm summers).

Conservation
 
Most of the Davis Mountains are in private ownerships.  However, since 1996, the Nature Conservancy has acquired 33,000 acres (130 km²) in the Davis Mountains range, along with conservation easements on 70,000 adjoining acres (280 km²) of private ranchland.  The Davis Mountain Preserve is open to the public at specified times.

Facilities
McDonald Observatory is accessed by Spur 78 from State Highway 118. Spur 78 is the highest state maintained road in Texas at 6,791 feet near the summit of Mt. Locke where the older telescopes of the observatory are located. Spur 77 branches off from Spur 78 providing access to the newer research equipment atop Mt. Fowlkes.

Texas separatist standoff
The Texas separatist organization known as the Republic of Texas has its origins in the Davis Mountains. On April 27, 1997, the leader of the group, Rick McLaren, staged an attack on his neighbor's house and demanded that he cede his property to the Republic of Texas. This led to 300 state troopers surrounding his house with  his five followers, his wife,  the victims of the attack, and him inside for close to a week. Ultimately, one follower was shot in the standoff and McLaren was arrested and imprisoned for the equivalent of a life sentence.

References

External links

 
 Davis Mountains and Indian Lodge - December 5, 2007 - Houston Chronicle
 Davis Mountains photographs, hosted by the Portal to Texas History
 Davis Mountains State Park - Texas Parks and Wildlife
 Davis Mountains Preserve - Nature Conservancy
 

Mountain ranges of Texas
Landforms of Jeff Davis County, Texas
Protected areas of Jeff Davis County, Texas
Nature Conservancy preserves